Duarte Jorge Gomes Duarte (born 27 August 1987), simply known as Duarte Duarte, is a Portuguese professional footballer who plays for Oliveirense as a midfielder.

Club career
Born in Vila Verde, Duarte spent 4 seasons at the youth academy of local club Vilaverdense with whom he made his professional debut. He made 13 appearances in his first season without scoring any goal. In 2009, he was transferred to Segunda Liga side Gil Vicente. After failing to play in any match in his second season, he joined Varzim. Here he was a hit, scoring 11 goals in 33 appearances.

In June 2012, he signed for Benfica B on a four-year contract for €250,000. However, he struggled in his new club. Duarte managed to make only 10 appearances among whom there were 6 starts. So, in January 2013, he was sold off to Paços Ferreira on a three and half year contract.

Upon joining Pacos, he was immediately loaned out to Segunda Liga club Oliveirense till the end of the 2013–2014 season.

References

External links
 
 

1987 births
Living people
Association football midfielders
Portuguese footballers
Portuguese expatriate footballers
People from Vila Verde
Varzim S.C. players
Atlético Petróleos de Luanda players
F.C. Paços de Ferreira players
Gil Vicente F.C. players
S.L. Benfica B players
U.D. Oliveirense players
G.D. Interclube players
C.D. Trofense players
F.C. Felgueiras 1932 players
S.C. Espinho players
Liga Portugal 2 players
Segunda Divisão players
Primeira Liga players
Portuguese expatriate sportspeople in Angola
Expatriate footballers in Angola
Sportspeople from Braga District